Cussül an Tavas Kernôwek (formerly Cussel an Tavas Kernûak; the Cornish Language Council) is an association founded in 1987 to teach, research and further the Cornish language in Cornwall (Cornish: Kernow), UK. Since the adoption of a Standard Written Form of Cornish (SWF) in 2008, it has worked closely with other bodies to achieve these aims. The Cussül encourages research into the Cornish of all periods but has a particular interest in developments after c.1600 and accordingly recommends a standard pronunciation based on c. 1600 to 1700. The Cussül largely draws its inspiration from those who attempted to save the language in the 18th century.

The Cussül is run by volunteers and is a network of associates rather than a formal membership organization.

See also
 List of topics related to Cornwall
 Cornish language

External links
Cussel an Tavas Kernuak website

Cornish language
Organisations based in Cornwall
Celtic language advocacy organizations